Dianne Esther Cunningham (born December 5, 1939) is a former politician in Ontario, Canada. She was a Progressive Conservative member of the Legislative Assembly of Ontario from 1988 to 2003, and a cabinet minister in the governments of Mike Harris and Ernie Eves.

Background
Cunningham worked as an elementary school teacher in private life, and entered politics by winning a seat on the London, Ontario school board in 1973. She retained that position for fifteen years, and also served as a Planning Officer for the Ontario Ministry of Community and Social Services.

Politics
Cunningham was elected to the Ontario legislature for the riding of London North in a 1988 by-election. The riding had previously been Liberal, and bordered on the seat belonging to Liberal Premier David Peterson; Cunningham's victory made her a rising star in the small Tory caucus. She ran for the leadership of the then third-place Conservatives in 1990, losing to Mike Harris in the party's first one member, one vote election for leader. She was considered a Red Tory, but was hurt by comparisons to Brian Mulroney, Canada's unpopular Progressive Conservative Prime Minister. Her loss to Harris led to a major shift in the political orientation of the party.

Cunningham was re-elected in the 1990 provincial election, which was won by the New Democratic Party.  During the next five years, the Tories developed a series of right-wing policy initiatives which became known as the "Common Sense Revolution".  Cunningham was not a major contributor to this process. She did, however, serve as her party's Deputy Leader and Caucus Whip from 1990 to 1995.

She was easily re-elected in the 1995 provincial election, which the Tories won.  While not in the Harris government's inner circle, she was appointed to cabinet in the minor portfolios of Minister of Intergovernmental Affairs and Minister responsible for Women's Issues.  She retained these positions throughout the Harris government's first term.  In 1998, she supported Hugh Segal for the leadership of the Progressive Conservative Party of Canada.

In the provincial election of 1999, Cunningham narrowly defeated New Democratic Party Member of Provincial Parliament (MPP) Marion Boyd in the redistributed riding of London North Centre (the Harris government had previously reduced the number of provincial ridings from 130 to 103, forcing many MPPs to run against one another).  Following the election, she was promoted to Minister of Training, Colleges and Universities, and retained that portfolio for the next four years.  She was also re-appointed as Minister responsible for Women's Issues on February 8, 2001. In 2002, she supported Ernie Eves to replace Mike Harris as party leader.

Cunningham was often criticized for the way her department managed the elimination of OAC levels from Ontario's high-school system. The decision reduced the standard high-school honours degree program from five years to four, and resulted in a "double cohort" of new university students when the policy first came into effect. University entrance marks were raised to what some considered high levels; for example, the University of Western Ontario raised their entrance cutoff to an 80% average. Because of this, many students were unable to attend the university of their choice, and poor departmental planning was frequently blamed.

She ran for re-election in the 2003 election, but lost to Deb Matthews by over 6,000 votes in the landslide victory that brought the Ontario Liberal Party to power.

Cabinet posts

Later life
After the election, she was appointed Director of the Lawrence National Centre for Policy and Management.

References

External links

1939 births
21st-century Canadian politicians
21st-century Canadian women politicians
Living people
Members of the Executive Council of Ontario
Politicians from London, Ontario
Politicians from Toronto
Progressive Conservative Party of Ontario MPPs
Women government ministers of Canada
Women MPPs in Ontario